The men's javelin throw event at the 1998 Commonwealth Games was held on 21 September in Kuala Lumpur.

Results

References

Javelin
1998